David Chappe (born November 8, 1947 in Brooklyn – May 13, 2002 in Los Angeles) was best known as the screenwriter who launched the bidding wars of the late 1980s with his script Gale Force. David was a novelist, photographer, screenwriting instructor, story editor, artist and pianist.

Personal life
Chappe was born in Flatbush, New York and moved to Appleton, Wisconsin at age eight. He competed as a concert pianist from ages six to 16 and led canoe trips in the Canadian wilderness of the Boundary Waters.  He earned his BA in History and Political Science from Alfred University, and his Master of Fine Arts from Visual Studies Workshop, Rochester, New York in 1978. He learned to tell stories through sequencing of photographic images and later used that visual story sense in writing screenplays. While at VSW Chappe printed dozens of small publications on their Heidelberg Press and moved to Los Angeles in 1980 to work for another small press.

Chappe died in 2002 after a four-year battle with angiosarcoma. He was survived by his wife June Stoddard, daughters Chloe and Jessica, mother Bess, brother Marc, aunt Millie Kleineman and nephew Durin.

Film career
Surrounded by screenwriters in Venice, California he wrote nearly twenty original screenplays and two novels. Prior to his screenwriting career David wrote for He-Man and the Masters of the Universe. In just five years he read and wrote coverage on over 5,000 screenplays, becoming the Story Editor for White Eagle Enterprises, Sylvester Stallone's company. In 1989 he finished Gale Force which was snapped up by Dan Melnick who partnered to produce it with Carolco and actively aided Carolco in the bidding. Stallone was to star. The script was repeatedly rewritten. Relative newcomer Renny Harlin was hired to direct and worked with seven rewriters. After years of rewrites the plug was pulled two weeks before production and the entire creative team moved to Cliffhanger.

After the sale of Gale Force Chappe continued to write original screenplays, novels, became a re-writer for Hollywood action films, and wrote the production draft of the 1999 film Beowulf.

Selected filmography
TV
He-Man and the Masters of the Universe Disappearing Act, 1983

Film
Beowulf, 1999

References

External links

Variety International" (USA) November 1998, pg. 1-, "Where are they now? Spec authors.."
"LA Weekly" (USA) June 1989, "Gale Force takes the Market by Storm"

1947 births
2002 deaths
American male screenwriters
Deaths from angiosarcoma
Visual Studies Workshop alumni
20th-century American male writers
20th-century American screenwriters
Deaths from cancer in California